No. 213 Squadron was a squadron of the Royal Air Force. The squadron was formed on 1 April 1918 from No. 13 (Naval) Squadron of the Royal Naval Air Service. This RNAS squadron was itself formed on 15 January 1918 from the Seaplane Defence Flight which, since its creation in June 1917, had had the task of defending the seaplanes which flew out of Dunkirk.

History

World War I
Formed originally from the Seaplane Defence Flight, which was itself founded in June 1917 at Dunkirk, it was reorganized as No. 13 Squadron RNAS on 15 January 1918. As the SDF, it operated Sopwith Pups. When the Royal Naval Air Service merged with the Royal Flying Corps to form the Royal Air Force, it was renumbered as 213 Squadron. In this incarnation, it flew Sopwith Baby floatplanes and transitioned to Sopwith Camels. It was during this time that the squadron derived its Hornet insignia and motto for the squadron badge, after overhearing a Belgian General refer to the squadron's defence of his trenches, "Like angry hornets attacking the enemy aircraft". The Hornet became affectionately known as "Crabro," Latin for hornet. The squadron's official motto became, "Irritatus Lacessit Crabro" (The Hornet Attacks When Roused). In March 1919 the squadron went back to the UK where it disbanded on 31 December 1919.

During its wartime existence, the squadron had 14 flying aces serve with it, including such notables as; 
John Edmund Greene, 
Colin Brown, 
George Chisholm MacKay, 
Leonard Slatter, 
Maurice Cooper, 
Miles Day, 
Ronald Graham, 
John Paynter,	 
John Pinder, and 
George Stacey Hodson.

Second World War
The squadron was reformed on 8 March 1937 flying Gloster Gauntlet IIs, converting to Hawker Hurricanes in January 1939 and flew throughout the war. It participated as part of the British Expeditionary Force; then at Dunkirk; the Battle of Britain and finally in the Middle East as part of the Desert Air Force. It also flew Supermarine Spitfires and North American Mustangs.

Post-Second World War
After the war, the squadron remained in the Middle East, first flying Hawker Tempests and then de Havilland Vampires. It was stationed at Deversoir in the Suez Canal Zone from October 1948 till its disbandment there on 30 September 1954.

With Bomber Command to RAF Germany
The squadron reformed once again on 1 September 1955 as an English Electric Canberra squadron, specialising in low level interdiction missions. It was the only squadron to fly the Canberra B(I).6 variant, still with the "Crabro" insignia adorning the tail fin, first from RAF Ahlhorn and later from RAF Bruggen, while a detachment was for a short time in 1956 stationed at Valkenburg Naval Air Base in the Netherlands. The squadron finally disbanded on 31 December 1969.

Aircraft operated

Commanding officers

References

Bibliography

 Bowyer, Michael J.F and John D.R. Rawlings. Squadron Codes, 1937-56. Cambridge, Cambridgeshire, UK: Patrick Stephens Ltd., 1979. .
 Flintham, Vic and Andrew Thomas. Combat Codes: A Full Explanation and Listing of British, Commonwealth and Allied Air Force Unit Codes Since 1938. Shrewsbury, Shropshire, UK: Airlif Publishing Ltd., 2003. .
 Halley, James J. The Squadrons of the Royal Air Force & Commonwealth, 1918-1988. Tonbridge, Kent, UK: Air-Britain (Historians) Ltd., 1988. .
 Jefford, C.G. RAF Squadrons, a Comprehensive Record of the Movement and Equipment of all RAF Squadrons and their Antecedents since 1912. Shrewsbury: Airlife Publishing, 1998 (second edition 2001). .
 Leeson, Frank M. The Hornet Strikes: the Story of 213 Squadron Royal AIr Force. Tonbridge, Kent, UK: AIr-Britain (Historians) Ltd., 1998. .
 Lewis, Peter. Squadron Histories: R.F.C, R.N.A.S and R.A.F., 1912-59. London: Putnam, 1959.
 Moyes, Philip J.R. Bomber Squadrons of the RAF and their Aircraft. London: Macdonald and Jane's (Publishers) Ltd., 1964 (new edition 1976). .
 Rawlings, John D.R. Fighter Squadrons of the RAF and their Aircraft. London: Macdonald and Jane's (Publishers) Ltd., 1969 (new edition 1976, reprinted 1978). .

External links

 213 sqn association
 The history of 213 SQN RAF
 RAF Website
 No. 213 sqn bases while in Fighter Command
 Squadron history and more on rafweb's 'Air of Authority'
 No. 213 sqn during the Battle of Britain

213 Squadron
Military units and formations in Mandatory Palestine in World War II